Henry Bernard Ollendorff (March 14, 1907 – February 10, 1979) was a German-Jewish social worker.

He was born as Heinz Bernard Ollendorff to an oculist in the town of Esslingen am Neckar, Germany. He grew up in the city of Darmstadt. He received his doctor's degree in law from the University of Heidelberg. The discrimination laws of Nazi Germany severely hindered him in his work and he even had to spend 13 months in prison before he emigrated together with his wife to the United States, in 1938.

In Cleveland, Ohio he studied social work. In 1954, the US Department of State asked him to participate in the re-education programme for Germans and he conducted courses for youth leaders and social workers in Hesse. He also had the idea to start an exchange program.

Now the Council of International Fellowship is a world wide organisation for professionals working in the field of social work.

Ollendorff died in Cleveland, Ohio.

Legacy
In 2007 the German city of Darmstadt gave his name to a square.

1907 births
1979 deaths
German social workers
American social workers
German emigrants to the United States